Elections were held in Stormont, Dundas and Glengarry United Counties, Ontario on October 25, 2010 in conjunction with municipal elections across the province.

Stormont, Dundas and Glengarry United Counties Council
Council consists of the mayors and deputy mayors of each of the townships. It does not include the city of Cornwall.

Cornwall

Mayor

Councillors

North Dundas

North Glengarry

North Stormont

South Dundas

South Glengarry

South Stormont

2010 Ontario municipal elections
United Counties of Stormont, Dundas and Glengarry